The UEFA Women's U-19 Championship 2002 Final Tournament was held in Sweden between 2 and 12 May 2002. Players born after 1 January 1983 were eligible to participate in this competition.

Squads

Group stage

Group A

Group B

Bracket

Semifinals

Final

Sources
 Swedish FA

 
UEFA Women's Under-19 Championship
Women
UEFA
International women's association football competitions hosted by Sweden
2002 in Swedish women's football
2001–02 in German women's football
2001–02 in English women's football
2001–02 in Danish women's football
2001–02 in Swiss football
2002 in Norwegian women's football
2001–02 in Spanish women's football
May 2002 sports events in Europe
2002 in youth association football